Susan Rossi (born 5 March 1963) is a Canadian luger. She competed in the women's singles event at the 1984 Winter Olympics.

References

External links
 

1963 births
Living people
Canadian female lugers
Olympic lugers of Canada
Lugers at the 1984 Winter Olympics
Sportspeople from Hamilton, Ontario